Daxing is a town under the administration of Ninglang Yi Autonomous County, Yunnan, China. , it has seven residential communities and six villages under its administration.

References 

Township-level divisions of Lijiang
Ninglang Yi Autonomous County